Malaysia participate in the 2022 World Games in Birmingham, United States, from 7 to 17 July 2022. The games were originally scheduled for July 2021, but were postponed due to the rescheduling of the Tokyo 2020 Olympic Games. Athletes representing Malaysia won two bronze medals and the country finished in 69th place in the medal table.

Medalists

Competitors
The following is the list of number of competitors in the Games.

Bowling

Malaysia won one bronze medal in bowling.

Men

Women

Water skiing

Malaysia competed in water skiing.

References

Nations at the 2022 World Games
2022
2022 in Malaysian sport